The 1988–89 Segunda División was the 40th season of the Mexican Segunda División. The season started on 2 September 1988 and concluded on 18 July 1989. It was won by Potros Neza.

Changes 
 Cobras was promoted to Primera División.
 UAT was relegated from Primera División. However, the team board bought the Deportivo Neza franchise and remained in Primera División. The relegated UAT franchise was bought by Atlante, placed in Ciudad Nezahualcóyotl and renamed Potros Neza, this team was an Atlante reserves squad.
 Santos Laguna was promoted to Primera División after bought the Ángeles de Puebla franchise. Querétaro taken the Santos Laguna spot in Segunda División.
 Pachuca and Nuevo León were promoted from Segunda División B.
 Ecatepec was promoted from Tercera División.
 Oaxaca, Texcoco and Águila Progreso Industrial were relegated from Segunda División.
 Apatzingán sold its franchise to Yucatán.

Teams

Group stage

Group 1

Group 2

Group 3

Group 4

Results

Final stage

Group 1

Group 2

Final

Relegation Group

References 

1988–89 in Mexican football
Segunda División de México seasons